In mathematics, a smooth maximum of an indexed family x1, ..., xn of numbers is a smooth approximation to the maximum function  meaning a parametric family of functions  such that for every , the function  is smooth, and the family converges to the maximum function  as . The concept of smooth minimum is similarly defined. The term can also be used loosely for a specific smooth function that behaves similarly to a maximum, without necessarily being part of a parametrized family.

Examples

Boltzmann operator 

For large positive values of the parameter , the following formulation is a smooth, differentiable approximation of the maximum function.  For negative values of the parameter that are large in absolute value, it approximates the minimum.

 has the following properties:
 as 
 is the arithmetic mean of its inputs
 as 

This makes the softmax function useful for optimization techniques that use gradient descent.

This operator is sometimes called the Boltzmann operator, after the Boltzmann distribution.

LogSumExp 

Another smooth maximum is LogSumExp:

The  term corrects for the fact that  by canceling out all but one zero exponential, and  if all  are zero.

Mellowmax 

The mellowmax operator is defined as follows:

It is a non-expansive operator. As , it acts like a maximum. As , it acts like an arithmetic mean. As , it acts like a minimum. This operator can be viewed as a particular instantiation of the quasi-arithmetic mean. It can also be derived from information theoretical principles as a way of regularizing policies with a cost function defined by KL divergence. The operator has previously been utilized in other areas, such as power engineering.

p-Norm 

Another smooth maximum is the p-norm:

An advantage of the p-norm is that it is a norm.  As such it is scale invariant (homogeneous): , and it satisfies the triangle inequality.

Smooth maximum unit 

The following binary operator is called the Smooth Maximum Unit (SMU):

where  is a parameter. As ,  and thus .

See also
 LogSumExp
 Softmax function
 Generalized mean

References

Mathematical notation
Basic concepts in set theory

https://www.johndcook.com/soft_maximum.pdf

M. Lange, D. Zühlke, O. Holz, and T. Villmann, "Applications of lp-norms and their smooth approximations for gradient based learning vector quantization," in Proc. ESANN, Apr. 2014, pp. 271-276.
(https://www.elen.ucl.ac.be/Proceedings/esann/esannpdf/es2014-153.pdf)